Borszowice refers to the following places in Poland:

 Borszowice, Gmina Imielno
 Borszowice, Gmina Sędziszów